Sezarud (also Romanized as Sezarūd and Sezā Rūd) is a village in Siyarastaq Yeylaq Rural District, Rahimabad District, Rudsar County, Gilan Province, Iran. At the 2006 census, its population was 101, in 26 families.

References 

Populated places in Rudsar County